Draparnaldia is a genus of freshwater green algae in the family Chaetophoraceae. Draparnaldia are uniseriate; each filament is composed of a chain of cells arranged in one row.  Chloroplasts appear as a band within the center of each cell.  The length of the main axis cells are generally the same, regardless of whether or not they bear branches.  These side branches are divided extensively into terminal hairs.  The entire plant is enveloped in loose, slippery mucilage. Draparnaldia is a cosmopolitan genus with wide distribution and it is usually found in cold aerated waters. They are either attached to sand or grow epiphytically on other aquatic plants. Draparnaldia can be seen growing in clear streams trailing on stones and boulders . Herman S. Forest of The Southern Appalachian Botanical Club has stated that while not common, it is present frequently enough to be recorded in almost all local flora lists of green algae that have been compiled. A multitude of species are present in Lake Baikal, Siberia and have been described by Meyer and Jasnitzky. A species of the genus had been placed and described in the Linnean Herbarium as Conferva Mutabilis Roth in 1797. Nowadays Conferva is no longer used and the species is described as Draparnaldia mutabilis (Roth) Bory. Bory is added in honour of the researcher of the same name, based on whose description the genus was separated from similar appearing forms. Bory is accredited with the establishment of the genus.

Morphology
Draparnaldia attaches to the substrate with rhizoids and is composed of erect, branching filaments surrounded by soft mucilage. Branches born in alternating, opposite, or whorls of tufts from the main axis. Chloroplasts tend to be parietal bands (i.e. "barrel shaped"). Tips of branches usually bear long, tapering hairs. The morphology is highly variable  being dependent upon several environmental conditions. The hairs develop through the elongation of the apical cell on the branch tips; as they elongate, the chloroplast is lost. Hair development is affected by the levels of phosphorus, nitrogen, carbon dioxide, and light. Although hair production can be suppressed under lab conditions, they are always present in the field.

Ecology
Draparnaldia is usually found attached to sand, sticks  or rocky substrate. It can be located in streams, ditches, springs, and shallow, peaty lakes, but usually only in cold, soft flowing waters. The hairs seem to function in nutrient uptake. Under low nutrient levels, the intensity of hair formation increases. It has been demonstrated that phosphatase activity is localized to the hairs and can be induced with decreasing phosphorus levels.

Taxonomy
The genus name of Draparnaldia is in honour of Jacques Philippe Raymond Draparnaud (1772–1804), who was a French naturalist, malacologist and botanist.

The genus was circumscribed by Jean Baptiste Bory de St. Vincent in Ann. Mus. Natl. Hist. Nat. Vol.12 on page 399 in 1808.

References

External links

Chaetophorales genera
Chaetophoraceae